Churchbridge Airport  is located  north-northeast of Churchbridge, Saskatchewan, Canada.

See also
List of airports in Saskatchewan

References

External links
Page about this airport on COPA's Places to Fly airport directory

Registered aerodromes in Saskatchewan
Churchbridge No. 211, Saskatchewan